Jeppe på bjerget (English: Jeppe of the Hill) is a 1981 Danish film directed by Kaspar Rostrup. The script, written by Henning Bahs, was based on a play of the same name by Ludvig Holberg.

The film was produced by Nordisk Film and debuted on 16 February 1981. It won three Bodil Awards: Best Film, Best Actor (for Buster Larsen) and Best Supporting Actor (for Kurt Ravn). It was also entered into the 12th Moscow International Film Festival.

Cast 
 Buster Larsen as Jeppe
 Else Benedikte Madsen as Nille
 Henning Jensen as Baronen
 Kurt Ravn as Erik Lakaj
 Benny Poulsen as Baronens sekretær
 Paul Barfoed Møller as Jacob Skomager
 Axel Strøbye as Ridefogeden
 Arthur Jensen as Jacobæus Lakaj
 Claus Ryskjær as Peter Kane Lakaj
 Claus Nissen as Peder Hammer Lakaj
 Benny Bjerregaard as Severin
 Jonny Eliasen as Morten Lakaj
 Frank Andersen as Jacob Lakaj
 Ole Ishøy as Baron
 Ove Verner Hansen as Baron

References

External links 
 

1981 comedy films
1981 films
Danish comedy films
Danish films based on plays
1980s Danish-language films
Best Danish Film Bodil Award winners